Dongo is a town and commune in the municipality of Jamba, province of Huíla, Angola.

Dongo is a junction on the Moçâmedes Railway for a branch line to Chamutete.

References

See also 
 Jamba, Huíla
 Railway stations in Angola
 Transport in Angola

Populated places in Huíla Province
Communes in Huíla Province